The Telangana Cabinet Ministers is the highest decision-making body of executive branch of the Government of Telangana, headed by the Chief Minister of Telangana. Telangana's current 18-member cabinet is also its first, being sworn in by the Governor of Telangana on 2 June 2014, the day of the state's birth. It is headed by K. Chandrasekhar Rao of the Telangana Rashtra Samithi, the first Chief Minister of Telangana.

Background
The first cabinet of the newly formed Indian state Telangana after bifurcating from the United Andhra Pradesh was formed on 2 June 2014. A 11 member cabinet was constituted initially by K. Chandrashekar Rao the elected chief minister in the 2014 Telangana Legislative Assembly election. On 16 December 2014 the cabinet was further expanded with inducting 6 members. On  25 June 2014 the then incumbent deputy chief minister and health minister T. Rajaiah was sacked from the council citing his charges of corruption in the medial and health department and indicating his involvement or ‘tacit ignorance’ of illegal actions in the department along with his incapability in handling the swine flu in the state. Kadiyam Srihari the member of parliament was then inducted into the council appointing him as the deputy chief minister and handing him over the duties of the education ministry. Along with this there was a minor cabinet reshuffling involving the transfer of ministries between C. Laxma Reddy and Guntakandla Jagadish Reddy.

Council of Ministers

Key
  Resigned from office

See also
N. Kiran Kumar Reddy ministry
Second K. Chandrashekar Rao ministry

References

Telangana ministry
Telangana Rashtra Samithi
Government of Telangana
2014 establishments in Telangana
2018 disestablishments in India
Cabinets established in 2014
Cabinets disestablished in 2018